The Rainbow Music Hall was a 1,485-capacity music venue located in Denver, Colorado at the intersection of Monaco and Evans. The venue opened in 1979 by concert promoter Barry Fey and closed in 1989. Many famous artists performed at the Rainbow Music Hall, including 
Journey,
AC/DC,
Bob Dylan,
Berlin,
B.B. King,
Elvin Bishop,
Black Flag,
Blackfoot,
Bobby & The Midnights,
David Bromberg,
Savoy Brown,
Roy Buchanan,
The Call,
Cheech & Chong,
Stanley Clarke,
John Cougar,
The Cult,
The Cure,
The Damned,
Def Leopard,
Rick Derringer, 
The Dirt Band,
Dixie Dregs,
Bob Dylan, 
The English Beat,
Erasure,
Gamma,
Greg Kihn Band,
Jean-Luc Ponty,
Jerry Garcia,
J. Geils Band,
Judas Priest,
Gentle Giant,
Bruce Hornsby,
Joe Jackson,
Al Jarreau,
Howard Jones,
The Knack,
Leo Kottke,
Lonnie Mack,
McGuinn, Clark & Hillman,
Jim Messina,
Metallica,
Midnight Oil,
Minutemen,
Katy Moffatt,
Willie Nelson,
Siouxsie and the Banshees,
Stevie Nicks,
Graham Parker,
Tom Petty,
The Police,
The Pretenders,
Prince,
John Prine,
Rainbow,
The Ramones,
Bonnie Raitt,
Reconstruction, Red Hot Chili Peppers,
R.E.M.,
Roxy Music,
Siouxsie and the banshees,
The Specials,
Rick Springfield,
Steppenwolf,
Thin Lizzy,
Peter Tosh,
Tanya Tucker,
U2,
Suzanne Vega,
Stevie Ray Vaughan,
Tom Waits,
Jerry Jeff Walker,
Wall of Voodoo,
Johnny Winter,
Warren Zevon,
38 Special, Anthrax and Pat Benatar. On May 9, 1979 Journey recorded a live performance. The concert was just after the release of their 5th studio LP Evolution.

References

 Metallica and Motorhead "Rainbow Music Hall about to take its last bow" - Mark Brown, Rocky Mountain News. March 11, 2008
 Kim Allen, Denver Photo Archives (Westword) http://www.denverphotoarchives.com/blog/2009/august.html
 Concert Promoter Barry Fey http://barryfey.com/

Music venues in Colorado
Music of Denver